Mezhdurechye is a rural locality (a settlement) in Vtorokamensky Selsoviet, Loktevsky District, Altai Krai, Russia. The population was 86 as of 2013. There is 1 street.

Geography 
Mezhdurechye is located on the Kamenka River, 32 km northeast of Gornyak (the district's administrative centre) by road. Gilyovo is the nearest rural locality.

References 

Rural localities in Loktevsky District